The Stade Jean-Ivoula, colloquially known as Stade de l'Est, is a multi-use stadium in Saint-Denis, Réunion. It is currently used mostly for football matches.  The stadium holds 7,500.

See also
Réunion national football team

References

Football venues in Réunion
Buildings and structures in Saint-Denis, Réunion
Sport in Saint-Denis, Réunion